The Government Rose Garden (formerly known as the Jayalalithaa Rose Garden, Centenary Rose Park and Nootrandu Roja Poonga) is situated on the slopes of the Elk Hill in Vijayanagaram of Ooty town in Tamil Nadu, India at an altitude of 2200 meters.

Establishment
The Rose Park was established at Vijayanagaram in Ooty town to commemorate the Centenary Flower Show in the Government Botanical Gardens, Udagamandalam in May 1995. The flowers are arranged in five curving terraces covering four hectares. The garden is maintained by the Tamil Nadu Horticulture Department.

Features

Ooty has a unique tropical mountain climate, hence the garden has the ideal climatic conditions for growing roses. Temperature variation is low and the rainfall distribution is uniform, which results in a long flowering season. The garden is visited by thousands of tourists throughout the year, even in winter when it is not the flowering season.

The Government Rose Garden located in the heart of Ooty is one of the largest rose gardens in India and also a popular tourist attraction. The beautiful garden is spread across 10 acres of land and houses some of the largest collections of roses in the country including miniature roses, hybrid tea roses, floribunda, ramblers, black and green roses and many other unique varieties. The Rose Garden is not only a delight for the eyes and the senses but also a must-visit for those interested in horticulture.

Initially, when the gardens were developed, 1,919 varieties of roses with 17,256 rose plants were planted. Today there are more than 20,000 varieties of roses of 2,800 cultivars. It is one of the largest collections of roses in India.

The collection of roses includes Miniature Roses, Ramblers, Hybrid Tea Roses, Yakimour, Polyanthas, Papagena, Floribunda and roses of unusual colours such as green and black. The varieties of rose plants planted here were assembled from different sources around the world.

The garden has been laid out with rose tunnels, pergolas and bowers with rose creepers. The slopes of the garden also features the Nila Maadam, an observation platform. From the Nila Maadam, tourists can observe the entire rose garden. The garden also features a statue of an angel amidst the roses.

Recognition
The rose garden received the Garden of Excellence Award for being the best rose garden in south Asia, from the World Federation of Rose Societies in May 2006, in Osaka, Japan. This garden is one of the 35 gardens worldwide to have received this award.

See also
 Ooty Lake
 Stone House, Ooty
 Mariamman temple, Ooty
 Ooty Golf Course
 St. Stephen's Church, Ooty

References

External links 

 Ooty – History and Tourism Page Official
 360° Panoramic View of the garden

Botanical gardens in India
Rose gardens
1995 establishments in Tamil Nadu
Tourist attractions in Nilgiris district
Protected areas of Tamil Nadu
Tourist attractions in Ooty
Botanical gardens in Tamil Nadu
Buildings and structures in Ooty
Culture of Ooty